Rosemarie Franklin (1 February 1943 – 2 December 2000) born in Rhosllanerchrugog  a village near Wrexham. She was a Welsh actress, model and beauty queen who won Miss World 1961, having previously finished as first runner-up at Miss Universe 1961.

Biography
Born in Rhosllannerchrugog, Wrexham, north-east Wales in 1943, Frankland moved to Lancashire, England, as a child. She took part in many beauty pageants and won the title of Miss Wales and, later in 1961 in London, she became (as Miss United Kingdom) the first British woman and the seventh European (Sweden won the two first contests, France won in 1953, Germany three years later, Finland in 1957 and the Netherlands in 1959) to win the Miss World competition. She also was the first runner-up at Miss Universe 1961. 

Together with Gina Swainson, who won the Miss World title as Miss Bermuda in 1979, Frankland is one of the two women who came closest to winning both Miss Universe and Miss World, having been second at Miss Universe before winning Miss World. Helen Morgan who was also Miss Wales and Miss United Kingdom, achieved the same feat, but she resigned the Miss World title four days after being crowned.

When Bob Hope crowned her as Miss World, he commented that she was the most beautiful girl he had ever seen. As part of her tenure as Miss World, she joined Hope at a USO concert in Alaska and reportedly had an affair with the comedian lasting many years, later becoming his personal assistant.

After Miss World, Frankland embarked on a short-lived acting career. Her most substantial (and last) role was in the 1965 film, I'll Take Sweden starring Bob Hope. In 1970, she married the Grass Roots singer/guitarist, Warren Entner and went to live in Los Angeles. In 1976, she gave birth to their only child together, a daughter, Jessica. The couple divorced in 1981.

Death
According to reports, Frankland died from a drug overdose in December 2000 in Marina del Rey, California, after battling depression. Her ashes were flown back to Wales and were buried at Rhosllannerchrugog Cemetery in February 2001.

Filmography
 We Shall See (1964) - Waitress
 The Edgar Wallace Mystery Theatre (1 episode, 1964) - Waitress
 The Beauty Jungle (1964) - Miss Australia (uncredited)
 A Hard Day's Night (1964) - Brunette Showgirl (uncredited)
 I'll Take Sweden (1965) - Marti (final film role)

References

External links
 

1943 births
2000 deaths
20th-century British actresses
Drug-related deaths in California
Miss United Kingdom winners
Miss Universe 1961 contestants
Miss World 1961 delegates
Miss World winners
People from Rhosllanerchrugog
Welsh beauty pageant winners
Welsh expatriates in the United States
Welsh female models
Welsh film actresses
Welsh television actresses
2000 suicides
United Service Organizations entertainers